Adelino José Martins Batista (born 30 August 1971), known as Jordão, is a Portuguese former footballer who played as a defensive midfielder.

Club career
Born in Malanje, Portuguese Angola, Jordão made his professional debut in 1990 for Lisbon-based C.F. Estrela da Amadora, but it took several years for him to become an important first-team member, also being loaned twice, to S.C. Campomaiorense and Leça FC, both in the second division (he also did not manage to appear regularly for the former).

After two solid seasons at Estrela, Jordão joined Primeira Liga club S.L. Benfica, but was soon deemed surplus to requirements following the arrival of Graeme Souness as manager, and moved to fellow league team S.C. Braga in January 1998, where he would spend an additional two campaigns.

In August 2000, having already played one league match for Braga, Jordão joined English side West Bromwich Albion for a transfer fee of £350,000, and made his debut in the same month against Barnsley. In 2001–02, he scored one of his five league goals (a career-best) in the Black Country derby win against Wolverhampton Wanderers at Molineux Stadium, helping Albion to achieve automatic promotion to the Premier League.

After 71 appearances across all competitions – only three in the top flight – and eight goals for WBA, Jordão was released in the summer of 2003, re-joining Estrela da Amadora in January of the following year and playing sparingly until his retirement three years later.

References

External links

1971 births
Living people
Footballers from Malanje
Portuguese sportspeople of Angolan descent
Angolan footballers
Portuguese footballers
Association football midfielders
Primeira Liga players
Liga Portugal 2 players
C.F. Estrela da Amadora players
S.C. Campomaiorense players
Leça F.C. players
S.L. Benfica footballers
S.C. Braga players
Premier League players
English Football League players
West Bromwich Albion F.C. players
Portugal youth international footballers
Portugal under-21 international footballers
Portuguese expatriate footballers
Expatriate footballers in England
Portuguese expatriate sportspeople in England